The true soles are a family, Soleidae, of flatfishes. It includes saltwater and brackish water species in the East Atlantic, Indian Ocean, and West and Central Pacific Ocean. Freshwater species are found in Africa, southern Asia, New Guinea, and Australia.

In the past, soles of the Americas (both fresh and salt water) were included in this family, but they have been separated to their own family, the American soles (Achiridae). The only true sole remaining in that region is Aseraggodes herrei of the Galápagos and Cocos Island.

The true soles are bottom-dwelling fishes feeding on small crustaceans and other invertebrates. The family contains 30 genera and a total of about 180 species.

Soles begin life as bilaterally symmetric larvae, with an eye on each side of the head, but during development, the left eye moves around onto the right side of the head. Adult soles lie on their left (blind) sides on the sea floor, often covered in mud, which in combination with their dark colours, makes them hard to spot.

This observation has been questioned by fish experts, and recent authorities do not recognize it as valid.

Many soles are important food species: the common sole, Solea solea, is popular in northern Europe and the Mediterranean.

References 

 
Ray-finned fish families
Taxa named by Charles Lucien Bonaparte